CL or cl may refer to:

Arts and entertainment 
 CL (rapper) or Lee Chae-rin (born 1991), singer and rapper, former leader of the K-pop girl group 2NE1
 Creative Loafing, a newspaper publisher

Brands and enterprises 
 Colgate-Palmolive's NYSE stock symbol
 Companhia das Lezírias, an agribusiness company in Portugal

Computing and technology 
 , the command-line C/C++ compiler for Microsoft Visual C++
 .cl, Internet country code top-level domain for Chile
 CL register, the low byte of an X86 16-bit CX register
 CAS latency, a measure used in computer memory
 Common Lisp, a programming language
 Common Logic, a framework for a family of logic languages
 Control Language, a scripting language for the IBM AS/400 midrange platform

Industry and technology 
 CL, the prefix for Canadair manufactured aircraft model numbers
 Caseless ammunition

Organizations 
 Catholic League (U.S.), also known as The Catholic League for Religious and Civil Rights
 Communion and Liberation, a lay ecclesial movement within the Catholic Church

Places 
 Chile's ISO country code
 Province of Caltanissetta's ISO 3166-2:IT code
 Călărași County's ISO 3166-2:RO code

Science 
 cl (elliptic function), cosine lemniscate function
 Centilitre (cL), a metric measure of volume
 Chlorine, symbol Cl, a chemical element
 Confidence level
 Lift coefficient (CL)
 Topological closure

Sports 
 Closer (baseball), a relief pitcher who specializes in finishing a game
 Central League, one of two leagues in Japan's Nippon Professional Baseball
 Continental League, a 1959 proposed third major league for baseball in Canada and the United States

Transportation 
 Acura CL, a Japanese-American mid-size coupe
 Mercedes-Benz CL-Class, a German sports car
 Light cruiser's US Navy hull classification 
 Lufthansa CityLine's IATA code

Other uses 
 Certificated Location, a Caravan Club site
 150 (number) or CL in Roman numerals
 Light crude oil's New York Mercantile Exchange symbol
 Shilluk language's ISO 639-1 language code
 Centerline, an engineering drawing symbol, stylized by an overlapping C and L (℄)

See also 
 C1 (disambiguation)
 CI (disambiguation)
 Champions League (disambiguation), various sports organizations